Riyaz Khan is an Indian actor and bodybuilder. He predominantly works in Malayalam and Tamil films and television series, besides acting in a few Telugu and Kannada films, as well as two Hindi films. Riyaz debuted in Malayalam through the 1994 film Sukham Sukhakaram, directed by Balachandra Menon. Later, he went on to act in Tamil and Telugu films. After many years, he came back to the Malayalam film industry through the 2003 Mohanlal starrer Balettan.

Early and Personal Life
Khan was born to Rasheed, a Malayalam film producer and Rasheeda Baanu at Fort Kochi, Kerala. He has a sister, Roshini who is married. Since his father was a movie producer and all the South Indian movies were then shot in Madras, now known Chennai, his family migrated there. He had his primary education from Chennai and pursued his bachelor's degree from United States. He married actress Uma Riyaz, who is the daughter of Tamil music director Kamesh and actress Kamala Kamesh. The couple has two sons, Shariq Hassan and Samarth Hassan.

Career

His notable films include Badri (2001), Baba (2002), Ramana (2002), Balettan (2003), Winner (2003), Runway (2004), Vesham (2004) Power of Womeni (2005) Ghajini (2005), Thirupathi (2006), Stalin (2006) and Pokkiri Raja (2010).

He acted in the serial Nandini, which was aired on Sun TV.

He is also a brand ambassador of a Chennai-based fitness studio called Inshape Health & Fitness.

Filmography

Malayalam

 Sukham Sukhakaram (1994)
 Nandhagopalante Kusruthikal (1996)
 Raakkilikal (2000)
 Ennum Sambavami Yuge Yuge (2001)
 Balettan (2003) as Bhadran
 Symphony (2004) as Sathyanath
 Vajram (2004)
 Shambu (2004) as Parthasaradhi
 Jalolsavam (2004) as Dubai Jose / Cheenkanni Jose
 Runway (2004) as Chinnadan Babu
 Mayilattam (2004) as Ripper
 Vesham (2004) as Deepak
 Five Fingers (2005)
 Kochi Rajavu (2005) as Siva 
 Sarkar Dada (2005) as Abbas
 Isra (2005) as Revanna
 Hai (2005)
 Pauran (2005) as Thomachan
 Highway Police (2006) as C.I. Jayachandran
 Lion (2006) as Harshan
 Bada Dosth  (2006) as S.I. Niranjan Das
 Narakasuran (2006) as Supt. of Police Rajan 
 Yes Your Honour (2006) as Gopikrishnan
 Subhadram  (2007)
 Payum Puli  (2007)
 The Speed Track (2007) as Tinu Nalinakshan
 Rakshakan (2007) as Vedimara Zakir
 July 4 (2007) as Danny
 Indrajith (2007) as Rajendran
 Duplicate (2009) as ACP Antony Rosarrio
 Thirunakkara Perumal (2009) as Jose
 Rahasya Police (2009) as Kallan Keshu
 Pokkiri Raja (2010) as Maheendran
 The Thriller (2010) as Paramadayil Subhash
 Avan (2010)
 Vandae Matharam (2010)
 Campus Days (2011)
 Snehaadaram (2011)
 Pachuvum Kovalanum (2011)
 Oru Nunakkadha (2011)
 Manthrikanas Giri (2012)
 Red Alert (2012)
 The Hitlist (2012) 
 Casanovva (2012) as Joseph
 Grandmaster (2012) as Jerome Jacob
 Simhasanam (2012) as Vetrimaaran IPS
 Scene Onnu Nammude Veedu (2012)
 Mayamohini (2012)
 Mr. Marumakan (2012) as ACP Madhuram Ramachandran
 Karma Yodha (2012) as Sathan Sunny
 Nadodimannan (2013) as George TV
 Mumbai Police (2013) as Sniper Hitman
 Seconds (2014) 
 Villali Veeran (2014) As Giridhar Vishwanathan
 Shadow Man (2014) as Surya
 Ilanjikkavu P.O. (2015)
 TP 51 (2015)
 Ithinumappuram (2015) as Karthikeyan
 Samrajyam II: Son of Alexander (2015) as Sanjaydas
 Two Countries (2015) as Kiran, Laya's friend 
 Pachakkallam (2016) asS.I Madhuram
 Dhanayathra (2016)
 Aneezya (2016)
 Chinnadada (2016)
 Pakal Pole (2017)
 Nimisham (2018)
 Monnam Niyamam (2018)
 Jack & Daniel (2019)(cameo) 
 Aaraattu (2022) as Damodarji
 Power Star (TBD)
 Mayakottaram (TBD)
 Mathamgi (2022) as Soorya Narayanan

Tamil

 Athma (1993)
 Chinna Madam (1994)
 Kallazhagar (1999)
 Maayi (2000)
 Nageswari (2001)
 Badri (2001)
 Samudhiram (2001)
 Asokavanam (2001)
 Aalavandhan (2001)
 Shree (2002)
 Ramanaa (2002)
 Baba (2002)
 Kadhal Azhivathillai (2002)
 Winner (2003)
 Unnai Charanadaindhen (2003)
 Success (2003)
 Ottran (2003) 
 Enakku 20 Unakku 18 (2003)
 Bheeshmar (2003)
 Arasu (2003)
 Varnajalam (2004)
 Jana (2005)
 Gurudeva (2005)
 Power of Women (2005)
 Chinna (2005)
 Ghajini (2005)
 Thirupathi (2006)
 Perarasu (2006)
 Parattai Engira Azhagu Sundaram (2007)
 Muruga (2007)
 Cheena Thaana 001 (2007)
 Nam Naadu (2007)
 Vambu Sandai (2008)
 Vaitheeswaran (2008)
 Silandhi (2008)
 Azhagu Nilayam (2008)
 Arasangam (2008) 
 Akku (2008)
 Muthirai (2009)
 Malai Malai (2009)
 Aadhavan (2009)
 Jaganmohini (2009)
 Thairiyam (2010)
 Yathumaagi (2010)
 Vandae Maatharam (2010)
 Maanja Velu (2010)
 Sura (2010)
 Kutti Pisasu (2010)
 Vandhan Vendran (2011)
 Ponnar Sankar (2011)
 Mambattiyan (2011)
 Kantha (2013)
 Masss (2015)
 Tharkappu (2016)
Saagasam (2016)
 Aagam  (2016)
 Vilayattu Aarambam (2017)
 Bhaskar Oru Rascal (2018)
 Maya Maligai (2021)
 Ponniyin Selvan (2022)
 Sheela (2022)

Telugu
 Madhuranagarilo (1991)
 Nee Manasu Naaku Telusu (2003)
 Dongodu (2003)
 Shiva Shankar (2004)
 Guru (2005)
 Nayakudu (2005)
 Naayudamma (2006)
 Stalin (2006)
 Rajababu (2006)
 Tulasi (2007)
 Kaaraa Mazaaka (2009)
 WWW (2021)

Kannada
 Veera Kannadiga (2003) 
 Namma Basava (2005)
 Mohini 9886788888 (2006)
 Milana (2007)
 Bombat Car (2010)

Hindi
 Abhay (2001)
 Ghajini (2008)

Television

References

External links

Riyaz Khan at MSI

Male actors from Kochi
Male actors in Telugu cinema
Indian male film actors
Male actors in Kannada cinema
Tamil male actors
Living people
1972 births
Male actors in Malayalam cinema
20th-century Indian male actors
21st-century Indian male actors
Male actors in Malayalam television